The British Library Hannås Collection of Scandinavian Books is a collection of over 700 items of Scandinavian literature created by antiquarian bookseller Torgrim Hannås and donated to the British Library in 1984.

References 

British Library collections
Scandinavian culture